The National Science Museum Thailand (NSM) is a state enterprise established on 30 January 1995 under the Ministry of Higher Education, Science, Research and Innovation. NSM develops and currently operates 4 museums and 2 learning centers to raise public awareness of science for Thai society. The museums are the Science Museum, Natural History Museum, Information Technology Museum and RAMA 9 Museum. All the museums are located at Technopolis Khlong 5, Khlong Luang, Pathum Thani. The NSM's learning centers are NSM Science Square @ the Street Ratchada located in Bangkok and NSM Science Square @ Chiang Mai located in Princess Siridhorn AstroPark.

History 

 In 1990, the Ministry of Science and Technology at that time was assigned by the Thai government to establish a science museum. On 12 August 1992, the National Science Museum Thailand or NSM was founded to commemorate the Fifth Anniversary of Her Majesty Queen Sirikit The Queen Mother's Birthday and her leadership in integrating science, technology, Thai art and culture to develop and improve careers and the quality of life of the Thai people. The museum construction began in 1994. In the Royal Decree of Establishing the NSM, it is a state enterprise since 30 January 1995 to be under the Ministry of Science and Technology at that time, now called the Ministry of Higher Education, Science, Research and Innovation.
 The National Science Museum, Thailand started to develop its first museum, “The Science Museum”, located at Technopolis, 39 Moo 3 Khlong 5, Khlong Luang, Pathum Thani. With the unique structure represents a grouping of three huge cubes standing on their points joined along the edges, forming the most spectacular building in the complex. It consists of a 10,000 square meter area with 6 major themed exhibition areas and displaying hands-on models about basic science, science and technology in everyday life, and traditional Thai technology. The Science Museum is public opened on 8 June 2000
 In 2003, the Natural History Museum, which located next to the Science Museum, opened to the public. With the exhibition space of 3,000 square meter area, it displays knowledge about the evolution of life, the diversity of living creatures ranging from single cell organisms to species in the Kingdom, specimen preservation, taxidermy exhibition as well as research and collection.
 In 2011, NSM Science Square @ Chamchuri Square was developed as a learning center in the central of Bangkok.  It was located on the 4th and 5th floor of Chamchuri Square Building, Chulalongkorn University, Samyan. With 3,000 square meters of exhibition area, it exhibited science, technology, and innovation that showcased on hot issue and daily-life related exhibition as well as hands on education program. It was open to the public in March 2011, and it has now been closed since 31 December 2019.
 In 2013, the Information Technology Museum was opened to the public on a 9,300 square meter exhibition area near the Natural History Museum. The major theme is evolution of communication and computer technologies as an origin of computer development to the advancement of information technology.
 In 2019, the RAMA 9 Museum was founded to commemorate the Celebrations on the Auspicious Occasion of His Majesty King Bhumibol Adulyadej The Great's 80th Birthday Anniversary. The RAMA 9 Museum presents the highlights Project of His Majesty King Bhumibol Adulyadej The Great which related to the Sufficiency Economy Philosophy, and how to use scientific methods to solve the people and country's major problems. The Exhibition showcases on the evolution of life on the earth, ecosystems from all over the world and the biodiversity of Thailand and the world. The RAMA 9 Museum is opened to the public on 15 October 2019.
 In 2021, the new NSM Science Squares were developed and re-opened at the new location. The first NSM Science Square is in central Bangkok named “NSM Science Square @ The Street Ratchada” and has an interactive exhibition and activities for people in the center of Bangkok. The second NSM Science Square is located at AstroPark, Chiang Mai named “NSM Science Square @ Chiang Mai. It was established with the collaboration of the National Astronomical Research Institute of Thailand (NARIT). It has an area of interactive learning for the people of Northern Thailand. NSM Science Square are opened to the public in March 2021.

Our Museums

Science Museum 
With the area of 10,000 square meter area, there are 6 floors in the building with major themed exhibition areas displaying hands-on and interactive exhibits on science and technology in everyday life including: Temporary exhibitions, Pioneers of Science, Evolution of Science, Basic Science, Science and Technology in Daily Life, Science and Technology in Thailand, and Thai Traditional Technology.  Each floors contains the following contents:

1st Floor:  Pioneers of Science, Education Program Enjoy maker space, Engineering Design, Science Dome and Temporary Exhibition.

2nd Floor: History and Evolution of Science and Technology

3rd Floor: Basic Science, Energy Tunnel, and Cinergy 4D Theater

4th Floor: Our World, Geology, Geography, Climate Change and Deciding on a Happy Farm, structure, and building

5th Floor: Our body, Transportation, Quality of Life, Robotic and Automation and Nanotechnology  

6th Floor: Thai Traditional Technology

Natural History Museum 
The Natural History Museum serves as the country's center of reference for taxonomy, taxidermy exhibits and workshop, research and collection on biodiversity and nature. It displays knowledge about the evolution of life and the diversity of living creatures ranging from single cell organisms to the species in the Kingdom. Life-sized models of all kinds of plants and animals are displayed in a 3,000 square meter exhibition area. The exhibition zone consisting of 1,000 square meters. The temporary exhibitions and Boonsong Lekagul, M.D.’s exhibition zone consist of approximately 400 square meters. The total area is 1,400 square meters.  

The 4 major themes are exhibited including:

Zone 1: The Origin of the Earth

Zone 2: The Origin of life

Zone 3: Evolution of Life

Zone 4: Biodiversity

The Natural History Museum also preserves a large collection of both wet and dry specimens from nature in a 1,200 square meter area. When the Natural History Museum was established, the specimen collection of birds and mammals was originally donated by Boonsong Lekagul, M.D.’ s family, while the specimen collection of fish, amphibians, reptiles, and invertebrates were donated from the Thailand Institute of Scientific and Technological Research. All the specimens have been continuously managed, preserved, and the collection has grown since then.

Information Technology Museum 
The Information Technology Museum displays a basic understanding of communication, computers, networks, and information technology, as well as demonstrating how research and development can lead to new ideas. The museum aims to prepare the Thai people to aware of and get ready for digital revolution in the society as one of the fundamental developments of the nation. The permanent exhibition in the museum   shows the evolution of technology from prehistoric times to the present day. The interactive hands-on, exhibitions, showcases and interesting artifacts in computer and communication technologies are exhibited through modern light and sound effects. The museum also provides various of interactive activities to maximize the informal learning experience for their visitor. The are 6 major themes in the permanent exhibition illustrated including:

Zone 1: The Evolution of Information and Technology

Zone 2: The Pre-Historic and Historic Communication

Zone 3: The Electronic Communication

Zone 4: Calculation

Zone 5: Computer

Zone 6: Information Technology Application and Quality of Life

RAMA 9 Museum 
RAMA 9 Museum was founded to commemorate the Celebrations on the Auspicious Occasion of

His Majesty King Bhumibol Adulyadej The Great's 80th Birthday Anniversary. The RAMA 9 Museum presents the highlights Project of His Majesty King Bhumibol Adulyadej The Great which related to the Sufficiency Economy Philosophy, and how to use scientific methods to solve the people and country's major problems. The Exhibition showcases on the evolution of life on the earth, ecosystems from all over the world and the biodiversity of Thailand and the world.

The RAMA 9 museum also serves as a resource for information about Thailand's relationship with the world's ecosystems, and a center for public knowledge of ecosystem conservation and preparedness for natural disasters. The 3 major themes of exhibitions include:

Zone 1: Our Home.

Zone 2: Our Life.

Zone 3: Our King.

NSM Science Square

NSM Science Square @ The Street Ratchada, Bangkok 
NSM Science Square @ The Street Ratchada is a learning space located in central Bangkok and managed by the NSM that encourages lifelong learning and provides experiences and inspiration to learn science, technology, and innovation through exhibitions and interactive activities including:

1. BLUE BOX IMAGINARIUM

2. Inspiration Lab

3. Innovation Space

4. Explorium

5. I-SCREAM

NSM Science Square @ AstroPark, Chiang Mai 
NSM Science Square @ AstroPark, Chiang Mai, located at Princess Sirindhorn AstroPark, National Astronomical Research Institute of Thailand (Public Organization), NARIT, Chiang Mai. This is a scientific, technology, and innovation learning center that provides the Thai youth with hands-on experience and inspiration for future careers in science, technology, and innovation. The interactive exhibition and activities are basic and easy to understand. The goal of this center is to encourage visitors to respond to the development of human resources in terms of futuristic and industrial occupations for the nation's development. On 1,3000 square meters, NSM Science Square @ AstroPark aims to improve educational opportunities for students living in regional and remoted areas. The 4 major themes of exhibition include:

Zone 1 The Careers of the Future

Zone 2 Open the Biomedical World

Zone 3 Disaster Operating Base

Zone 4 Aviation and Aerospace Technology

Science Caravan and Travelling Exhibitions 
Our traveling museum, the Science Caravan, was founded in 2005 in collaboration with local organizations, such as schools, universities, and local government agencies. Through our interactive presentations and activities, the Caravan demonstrations are basic and easy understanding through enjoyment and inspiration, motivating people to learn science as a kind of informal learning.

Educational Activities 
The educational activities foster the development of scientific thinking based on evidence. Through the science and culture camp, science laboratory, science show, planetarium, and among other activities, the activities are designed to encourage personal development for the Thai youth to empower their mind and thoughts as a vital force for creativity and to develop the nation sustainably.

Gallery

Literature

References

External links
 National Science Museum Thailand

Museums established in 2000
Science museums in Thailand
Natural history museums in Thailand
Buildings and structures in Pathum Thani province
Tourist attractions in Pathum Thani province
2000 establishments in Thailand
State enterprises of Thailand